Votruba (feminine: Votrubová), also spelled Wotruba, is a surname of Czech and Slovak origin.

Persons named Votruba or Wotruba include:

 Fritz Wotruba (1907–1975), Austrian sculptor
 Jaroslav Votruba (born 1939), Czech figure skater
 Jiří Votruba (born 1946), Czech illustrator

See also
 
 
 Otruba (surname)

Czech-language surnames
Slovak-language surnames